This is a list of members of the Australian Senate from 1932 to 1935. Half of its members were elected at the 17 November 1928 election and had terms starting on 1 July 1929 and finishing on 30 June 1935; the other half were elected at the 19 December 1931 election and had terms starting on 1 July 1932 and finishing on 30 June 1938. The process for filling casual vacancies was complex. While senators were elected for a six-year term, people appointed to a casual vacancy only held office until the earlier of the next election for the House of Representatives or the Senate.

Notes

References

Members of Australian parliaments by term
20th-century Australian politicians
Australian Senate lists